Xocavənd (also, Khodzhavend) is a village and municipality in the Aghjabadi Rayon of Azerbaijan.  It has a population of 3,018.

Notable natives 

 Sadig Huseynov — National Hero of Azerbaijan.

References 

Populated places in Aghjabadi District